Banawurun is a band from Brisbane, Queensland. Their music has been described aa "outback Motown". They started in 2004 as a duo of Troy Brady and Trevelyn Brady. They expanded and became Troy n Trevelyn & The Tribe and changed their name in 2007 to Banawurun (which means running water). Troy and Trevelyn had previously worked together in a band called Velocity. Banawurun played in the US in 2006, performing in Los Angeles's Viper Room. They won a Deadly in 2007 for Band of the Year. Their single "Power to the People" was also nominated for a Deadly. Troy Brady is a former member of Aim 4 More.

Discography
 "Power to the People" (2007)
 Stone Cold ep (2007)
 Insanity ep (2007)

References

Musical groups from Brisbane
Indigenous Australian musical groups
Musical groups established in 2004